Khairunnisa is an Arabic female given name. It can also be spelt as Kherunnisa or Khair-un-nisa. Khair means "good" and nisa means "women", so the complete name means "goodness of women". It is the epithet for Khadijah bint Khuwaylid, Muhammad's first wife and the first Muslim convert.

The name is transliterated as Hayrünnisa in Turkey.

There are several other names with the suffix -un-nisa, such as Mehr-un-nisa and Zeb-un-nisa. The name "Nisa" can also be used independently and may alternatively be written as "Nissa", "Nysa", "Neesa" and "Nessa".

Notable people
Salsabila Khairunnisa, Indonesian environmental activist

See also
 Hayrünnisa
 Arabic name
 Turkish name

Arabic feminine given names